Mahendrapul (Nepali:महेन्द्र पुल) is the financial hub and busiest high street of Pokhara. It is one of the oldest and busiest marketplaces in the city. It is one of the centre locations in the city. Mahendrapul is one of the most frequented marketplace in the whole of Pokhara. From clothing, Banking, jewellery to electronics. It is named after the Bridge named Mahendrapul. It is the bridge over Seti River and this bridge links Ranipauwa to Mahendrapool.

Origin of the name 
Mahendra means the name of Late King Mahendra Bir Bikram Shah and Pul means Bridge.

Boundaries of Mahendrapul 
 East: Ranipauwa
 West: Chipledhunga
 North: Palekhe Chowk
 South: Naya Bazar

References 

Neighbourhoods in Pokhara
Populated places in Kaski District